Karl Heinrich von Boetticher (6 January 1833 – 6 March 1907) was a German conservative statesman. He served as the secretary of the Interior (1880–1897), and the vice-chancellor of the German Empire (1881–1897).

Biography
Born in Stettin in Pomerania, the son of a judge, Boetticher studied law in the University of Würzburg and the University of Berlin. He was governor of Schleswig in 1876. In 1878 he became a member of the Reichstag for the Free Conservative Party. In 1879, he was lieutenant general of the province of Schleswig-Holstein. In 1880 he succeeded Karl von Hofmann as Secretary of the Interior of the German Empire. In 1881, he also became vice chancellor in Bismarck's cabinet. He held both positions until 1897.

As the representative of Chancellor Bismarck, Boetticher introduced numerous social reforms, and the enactment of the invalid and old-age insurance laws in 1889 was due principally to his energy and executive ability.

Honours
He received the following orders and decorations:

References

Literature 

1833 births
1907 deaths
Deputy prime ministers of Prussia
Finance ministers of Germany
Free Conservative Party politicians
German Protestants
Grand Cordons of the Order of the Rising Sun
Humboldt University of Berlin alumni
Interior ministers of Germany
Members of the 4th Reichstag of the German Empire
Members of the Prussian House of Lords
Members of the Prussian House of Representatives
People from the Province of Pomerania
Politicians from Szczecin
Recipients of the Order of the Netherlands Lion
University of Würzburg alumni
Vice-Chancellors of Germany
Karl Heinrich
Provincial Presidents of Saxony